Luvambu Filipe (born 3 June 1969) is an Angolan sailor. He competed in the men's 470 event at the 1992 Summer Olympics.

References

External links
 

1969 births
Living people
Angolan male sailors (sport)
Olympic sailors of Angola
Sailors at the 1992 Summer Olympics – 470
Place of birth missing (living people)